Yasmin Zammit Stevens is a Maltese  weightlifter.

She competed at the 2018 European Small Nations Weightlifting Tournament. She represented Malta at the 2020 Summer Olympics in women's 64 kg event. She also competed in the women's 64 kg at the 2021 World Weightlifting Championships held in Tashkent, Uzbekistan. In October 2021, she participated in the Queen's Baton Relay ahead of the 2022 Commonwealth Games.

In December 2022, she was elected as member of the IWF Athletes' Commission.

References

External links

1993 births
Living people
Weightlifters at the 2020 Summer Olympics
Olympic weightlifters of Malta
Maltese female weightlifters
University of Malta alumni
21st-century Maltese women
20th-century Maltese women